Novactaea is a genus of crabs in the family Xanthidae, containing the following species:

Novactaea bella Guinot, 1976
Novactaea michaelseni (Odhner, 1925)
Novactaea modesta (De Man, 1888)
Novactaea pulchella (A. Milne-Edwards, 1865)

References

Xanthoidea